These are the squads for the 1984 European Football Championship tournament in France, which took place between 12 June and 27 June 1984.  For this tournament, UEFA reduced the squad size from 22 to 20 players. The players' listed ages is their age on the tournament's opening day (12 June 1984).

Group 1

Belgium
Manager: Guy Thys

Denmark
Manager:  Sepp Piontek

France
Manager: Michel Hidalgo

Yugoslavia
Manager: Todor Veselinović

Group 2

Portugal
Manager: Fernando Cabrita

Romania
Manager: Mircea Lucescu

Spain
Manager: Miguel Muñoz

West Germany
Manager: Jupp Derwall

External links
RSSSF
weltfussball.de 

Squads
1984